St James' Church, Staveley is a Grade II listed parish church in the Church of England in Staveley, Cumbria. Its benefice is united with that of St Martin's Church, Bowness-on-Windermere; St Anne's Church, Ings; St Cuthbert's Church, Kentmere; Jesus Church, Troutbeck and St Mary's Church, Windermere.

History

In the 1860s Staveley's 14th century church was replaced with a new one on a different site.  Only the tower of the old church survives.
The new church was designed by the architect, J. S. Crowther of Manchester, in Early English style. The foundation stone was laid on 24 September 1863 by General Upton, acting on behalf of Hon. Mrs Howard, the Lady of the Manor.

It was consecrated by the Bishop of Carlisle, Rt Revd Samuel Waldegrave on 24 April 1865 at which point the only outstanding item was the spirelet.

Incumbents

William Hudson ???? - 1658
James Robinson 1676 - 1691
William Harrison 1691 - 1724
Thomas Garnett 1724 - 1742
Isaac Knipe 1742 - 1754
William Langhorne 1754 - 1757
George Myres 1757 - 1806
Peter Strickland 1807 - 1837
James G. Elleray 1837 - 1858
William Chaplin (Sen.) 1858 - 1898
John Hawkesworth 1898 - 1902
William Chaplin 1902 - 1920
Ernest W.J. McConnel 1920 - 1943
Eric E. Oliver 1943 - 1976
Stephen Swidenbank 1976 - 1985
John Woolcock 1986 - 1993
Geoffrey Watson 1994 - 2013
Shanthi Thompson 2013 - current

Stained glass
East Window. Outstanding pre-Raphaelite glass made by Morris and Co to designs of Edward Burne-Jones 1878.

Organ

The church organ was built by Wilkinson and Son of Kendal and inaugurated on 25 September 1866 by Mr Smallwood of St George's Church, Kendal. A specification of the organ can be found on the National Pipe Organ Register.

References

Church of England church buildings in Cumbria
Gothic Revival architecture in Cumbria
Grade II listed churches in Cumbria
Churches completed in 1865